Hossein Pashaei (born March 7, 1979) is an Iranian footballer.

Club career
Pashaei joined Rah Ahan F.C. in 2007.

Club Career Statistics
Last Update  10 May 2014 

 Assist Goals

References

1979 births
Living people
Rah Ahan players
Pas players
Persian Gulf Pro League players
Iranian footballers
Association football midfielders